Acacia ascendens is a shrub of the genus Acacia and the subgenus Plurinerves that is endemic to a small area in south western Australia.

Description
The glabrous shrub has resinous and slightly viscid new growth. Like most species of Acacia it has phyllodes rather than true leaves. It blooms from June to September and produces yellow flowers. The inflorescences occur singly or in pairs on terminal or axillary racemes with spherical flower-heads containing 20 to 25 densely packed golden flowers.

Taxonomy
The species was first formally described by the botanist Bruce Maslin in 1990 as part of the work Acacia Miscellany. Three new Western Australian species with affinities to A. wilhelmiana (Leguminosae: Mimosoideae: Section Plurinerves) from Western Australia as published in the journal Nuytsia. It was reclassified as Racosperma ascendens by Leslie Pedley in 2003 and then transferred back to genus Acacia in 2014.
The shrub is closely related to Acacia abrupta and belongs to the Acacia wilhelmiana group.

Distribution
It is native to a small area in the Wheatbelt and Goldfields-Esperance regions of Western Australia where it is often situated on scree slopes of breakaways composed of granite.

See also
 List of Acacia species

References

ascendens
Acacias of Western Australia
Plants described in 1990
Taxa named by Bruce Maslin